R. oryzae may refer to:

 Rhizopus oryzae, a species of fungus
 Roseomonas oryzae, a species of Gram-negative bacteria